2001 J.League Cup Final was the 9th final of the J.League Cup competition. The final was played at National Stadium in Tokyo on October 27, 2001. Yokohama F. Marinos won the championship.

Match details

See also
2001 J.League Cup

References

J.League Cup
2001 in Japanese football
Yokohama F. Marinos matches
Júbilo Iwata matches
J.League Cup Final 2001